The Companion Guide to Rome is a composition for string trio by the American composer Andrew Norman.  The complete work was first performed on May 30, 2010 by the Scharoun Ensemble at Radialsystem V in Berlin.  The composition was a finalist for the 2012 Pulitzer Prize for Music.

Composition

Structure
The Companion Guide to Rome has a duration of roughly 30 minutes and is composed in nine movements:
Teresa
Benedetto
Susanna
Pietro
Ivo
Clemente
Lorenzo
Cecilia
Sabina

The ninth movement, "Sabina," was originally composed as a standalone piece in 2006 for the Janaki String Trio.  It can be performed separately or as part of the complete work.

Inspiration
The title of the work comes from the eponymous 1965 guidebook to Rome by Georgina Masson.  The movements thus commemorate nine of Norman's favorite Roman churches mentioned in the text.  Norman wrote in the score program note:The inspiration for each movement is as follows:
Teresa: The Ecstasy of Saint Teresa by Gian Lorenzo Bernini in the Cornaro Chapel, Santa Maria della Vittoria, Rome
Benedetto: the Cosmatesque floors in San Benedetto in Piscinula
Susanna: a fresco of the Mary in Majesty in the Chiesa di Santa Susanna
Pietro: Donato Bramante's Tempietto
Ivo: Sant’Ivo alla Sapienza
Clemente: Basilica di San Clemente
Lorenzo: a part of the Cosmatesque floor in the Basilica Papale di San Lorenzo fuori la mura
Cecilia: The statue of St. Cecelia by Stefano Maderno in Santa Cecilia in Trastevere
Sabina: Santa Sabina

References

Compositions by Andrew Norman
2006 compositions
2010 compositions
Contemporary classical compositions
Chamber music compositions
Music about Rome